Misar may refer to:
 Mišar, Serbia
 Misar, Iran
 Mishar Tatar dialect

See also
 Mishar (disambiguation)